Khleborodnoye is a rural locality (a selo) and the administrative center of Khleborodnenskoye Rural Settlement, Anninsky District, Voronezh Oblast, Russia. The population was 608 as of 2010. There are 7 streets.

Geography 
Khleborodnoye is located on the Kurlak River, 20 km east of Anna (the district's administrative centre) by road. Mokhovoye is the nearest rural locality.

References 

Rural localities in Anninsky District